Brindle is a small village and civil parish of the borough of Chorley, Lancashire, England.  The population of the civil parish at the 2011 census was 978. It is in the centre of a triangle between Preston, Blackburn, and Chorley. The area has little industry. Brindle is one of the more affluent areas in Lancashire , with average earnings over 33% higher than the national average. Occupations include professionals, teachers, and an increasingly retired population as well as some remaining agricultural employment.

Brindle is home to the Anglican St James' Church and a number of trails and bridle paths. As a parish offering excellent links to nearby towns including business centres such as Preston, Bolton, Chorley and Manchester. Brindle could be described as a commuter village although the village still retains a strong sense of local identity.

See also
Listed buildings in Brindle, Lancashire

References

External links

 Brindle chorley.gov.uk.
 Brindle Historical Society
 Brindle At War website
 Brindle Community Hall
 Brindle St Joseph's Church & Parish

Geography of Chorley
Villages in Lancashire
Civil parishes in Lancashire